Joanne Tseng Chih-chiao (born 17 November 1988) is a Taiwanese actress, singer and television host.

Early life 
Tseng was born on 17 November 1988 in Jianshi, Hsinchu, Taiwan. She has an older sister, Chih-ying (曾之萦). Both of her parents are teachers.

Her family is part of the Atayal indigenous Taiwanese tribe.

Tseng graduated from the National Taiwan University of Arts with a Drama & Theater degree. She plays the piano, flute, and violin.

Personal life 
She announced her marriage to Taiwanese singer Calvin Chen on 23 January 2020, via Instagram. She has been in a relationship with Chen for 10 years.

Career 
In 2002, Tseng, along with Esther Liu, formed a Mandopop duo called Sweety, and they debuted in 2003. Tseng and Liu were both only 14 years old when they debuted. Sweety was active from 2003 to 2006 and the duo released 3 studio albums and 2 soundtracks, but the group has been on hiatus since 2007 as a result of Liu starting her studies in Paris, and Tseng focusing on her solo career.

Apart from singing, both members have also acted in film and television series. Since becoming a soloist, Tseng has appeared and starred in numerous television series in both Taiwan and mainland China. She is currently signed under HIM International Music.

In 2017, Tseng relaunched her singing career by releasing her solo debut music video, eleven years after Sweety released their final album.

Filmography

Television series

Film

Variety show

Music video appearances

Discography

Extended plays

Published works

Awards and nominations

References

External links 

 
 
 
 Official Weibo

1988 births
Living people
Taiwanese Mandopop singers
Taiwanese television actresses
Taiwanese film actresses
People from Hsinchu County
Atayal people
National Taiwan University of Arts alumni
21st-century Taiwanese actresses
21st-century Taiwanese singers
21st-century Taiwanese women singers